Sydney Kingsford Smith Airport (colloquially Mascot Airport, Kingsford Smith Airport, or Sydney Airport;) is an international airport in Sydney, Australia, located 8 km (5 mi) south of the Sydney central business district, in the suburb of Mascot. The airport is owned by Sydney Airport Holdings. It is the primary airport serving Sydney and is a primary hub for Qantas, as well as a secondary hub for Virgin Australia and Jetstar, and a focus city for Air New Zealand. Situated next to Botany Bay, the airport has three runways.

Sydney Airport is one of the world's longest continuously operated commercial airports and is the busiest airport in Australia, handling 42.6 million passengers and 348,904 aircraft movements in 2016–17. It was the 38th busiest airport in the world in 2016. Currently, 46 domestic and 43 international destinations are served to Sydney directly.

In 2018, the airport was rated in the top five worldwide for airports handling 40–50 million passengers annually and was overall voted the 20th best airport in the world at the Skytrax World Airport Awards.

History

1911–1930: Early history
The land used for the airport had been a bullock paddock, with a lot of the area around Mascot being swampy. Flights had been taking off from at least 1911 from these fields, with aviators using other Sydney locations like Anderson Park and Neutral Bay for a few years prior. Nigel Love, who had been a pilot in the First World War, was interested in establishing the nation's first aircraft manufacturing company. This idea would require him to establish a factory and an aerodrome close to the city. A real estate office in Sydney told him of some land owned by the Kensington Race Club that was being kept as a hedge against its losing its government-owned site at Randwick. It had been used by a local abattoir which was closing down, to graze sheep and cattle.  This land appealed to Love as the surface was perfectly flat and was covered with a pasture of buffalo grass. The grass had been grazed so evenly by the sheep and cattle that it required little to make it serviceable for aircraft.  In addition, the approaches on all four sides had no obstructions, it was bounded by Ascot Racecourse, gardens, a river, and Botany Bay.

Love established the airfield at Mascot as a private concern, leasing  from the Kensington Race Club for three years. It initially had a small canvas structure but was later equipped with an imported Richards hangar. The first flight from Mascot was in November 1919 when Love carried freelance movie photographer Billy Marshall up in an Avro. The official opening flight took place on 9 January 1920, also performed by Love.

In 1921, the Commonwealth Government purchased  in Mascot for the purpose of creating a public airfield. In 1923, when Love's three-year lease expired, the Mascot land was compulsorily acquired by the Commonwealth Government from the racing club. The first regular flights began in 1924.

1930–1960
In 1933, the first gravel runways were built. By 1949 the airport had three runways – the  11/29, the  16/34, and the  04/22. The Cooks River was diverted away from the area in 1947–52 to provide more land for the airport and other small streams were filled. Sydney Airport was declared an aerodrome in 1920. On 14 August 1936, the airport was renamed Sydney (Kingsford Smith) Airport in honour of pioneering Australian aviator Sir Charles Kingsford Smith. Up to the early 1960s, the majority of Sydneysiders referred to the airport as Mascot. The first paved runway was on 07/25. The next runway constructed, 16/34 (now 16R/34L), was extended into Botany Bay to accommodate jet aircraft, which started arriving in 1959. Runway 07/25 is used mainly by lighter aircraft but is used by all aircraft including Airbus A380s when conditions require. Runway 16L/34R is mainly used by domestic aircraft and large aircraft up to the size of B767/A330/B787/B772/A359 but is used by more large aircraft such as B77L/B773/B77W/B744/A340/A35K/MD11 when no other runway is available.

Modern history

By the 1960s, the need for a new international terminal had become apparent, and work commenced in late 1966. Much of the new terminal was designed by Paynter and Dixon Industries with Costain appointed lead contractor.

The new terminal was officially opened on 3 May 1970, by Queen Elizabeth II. The first Boeing 747 "Jumbo Jet" at the airport, Pan Am's Clipper Flying Cloud (N734PA), arrived on 4 October 1970. The international terminal was expanded in 1992  and has undergone several refurbishments since then, including a major one in early 2000 in time for the 2000 Summer Olympics held in Sydney. The airport underwent another project development that began in 2010 to extend the transit zone which brought new duty-free facilities, shops & leisure areas for passengers. 

The limitations of having only two runways that crossed each other had become apparent and governments grappled with Sydney's airport capacity for decades. Eventually, the controversial decision to build a third runway was made. The third runway was parallel to the existing runway 16/34, entirely on reclaimed land from Botany Bay. A proposed new airport on the outskirts of Sydney was shelved in 2004, before being re-examined in 2009–2012 following reports that Kingsford Smith airport will not be able to cope by 2030.

Curfew
The "third runway", which the Commonwealth government commenced development of in 1989 and completed in 1994, remained controversial because of increased aircraft movements, especially over inner suburbs. In 1995 the No Aircraft Noise party was formed to contest the 1995 New South Wales state election. The party did not win a seat in parliament but came close in the electorate of Marrickville. It also contested the 1996 Australian federal election.

In 1995, the Australian Parliament passed the Sydney Airport Curfew Act 1995, which limits the operating hours of the airport. This was done in an effort to reduce airport noise over residential areas and thereby curb complaints. The curfew prevents aircraft from taking off or landing between the hours of 11 pm and 6 am. A limited number of scheduled and approved take-offs and landings are permitted respectively in the "shoulder periods" of 11 pm to midnight and 5 am to 6 am. The Act does not stop all aircraft movements overnight but limits noise by restricting the types of aircraft that can operate, the runways they can use and the number of flights allowed. During extreme weather, flights are often delayed and it is often the case that people on late flights are unable to travel on a given day. , fines for violating curfew have been levied against four airlines, with a maximum fine of A$550,000 applicable.

In addition to the curfew, Sydney Airport also has a cap of 80 aircraft movements per hour which cannot be exceeded, leading to increased delays during peak hours.

In 1998, the Federal Government agreed to separate Sydney Airport from the Federal Airports Corporation and to incorporate it as Sydney Airport Corporation. David Mortimer was appointed as Chair and Tony Stuart as CEO. Its mandate was to successfully redevelop the airport as the gateway for the Sydney 2000 Olympics, support the growth of new airlines such as Virgin and Emirates, and prepare it for a successful $3 billion-plus privatisation. In 2001 Sydney Airport was awarded World's Best Airport. In preparation for privatisation the airport argued successfully for a new regulatory regime.

Expansion 
In 2002, the Commonwealth Government sold Sydney Airport Corporation (SAC), to Southern Cross Airports Corporation Holdings for $5.4 billion. 83 percent of SAC is owned by MAp Airports International Limited, a subsidiary of Macquarie Group, Sydney Airport Intervest GmbH owns 12 percent and Ontario Teachers' Australia Trust owns 5 percent. SACL holds a 99-year lease on the airport which remains Crown land and as such is categorised as a Leased Federal Airport.

Since the international terminal's original completion, it has undergone two large expansions. One such expansion is underway and will stretch over twenty years (2005–25). This will include an additional high-rise office block, the construction of a multi-level car park, and the expansion of both international and domestic terminals. These expansions—and other plans and policies by Macquarie Bank for airport operations—are seen as controversial, as they are performed without the legal oversight of local councils, which usually act as the local planning authority for such developments. , some of the proposed development has been scaled back.

Sydney Airport's International terminal underwent a $500 million renovation that was completed in mid-2010. The upgrade includes a new baggage system, an extra  of space for shops and passenger waiting areas, and other improvements.

In March 2010, the Australian Competition & Consumer Commission released a report sharply critical of price gouging at Sydney airport, ranking it fifth out of five airports. The report noted Sydney Airport recorded the highest average prices at $13.63 per passenger, compared to the lowest at $7.96 at Melbourne Airport, while the price of short-term parking had almost doubled in the 2008–09 financial year, from $28 to $50 for four hours. The report also accused the airport of abusing its monopoly power.

Future

In December 2011, Sydney Airport announced a proposal to divide the airport into two airline-alliance-based precincts; integrating international, domestic, and regional services under one roof by 2019. The current domestic Terminal 2 and Terminal 3 would be used by Qantas, Jetstar, and members of the Oneworld airline alliance while today's international Terminal 1 would be used by Virgin Australia and its international partners. Other international airlines would continue to operate from T1.

In September 2012, Sydney Airport Managing Director and  CEO Kerrie Mather announced the airport had abandoned the proposal to create alliance-based terminals in favour of terminals "based around specific airline requirements and (passenger) transfer flows". She stated the plan was to minimise the number of passengers transferring between terminals.

In June 2013, the airport released a draft version of its 2033 Masterplan, which proposes operating domestic and international flights from the same terminals using 'swing gates', along with upgrading Terminal 3 (currently the Qantas domestic terminal) to accommodate the Airbus A380.

On 17 February 2014, the Australian Government approved Sydney Airport's Master Plan 2033, which outlines the airport's plans to cater to the forecast demand of 74 million passengers in 2033. The plan includes Sydney Airport's first-ever integrated ground transport plan.

Terminals

Sydney Airport has three passenger terminals. The International Terminal is separated from the other two by a runway; therefore, connecting passengers need to allow for longer transfer times.

Terminal 1

Terminal 1 was opened on 3 May 1970, replacing the old Overseas Passenger Terminal (which was located where Terminal 3 stands now), and has been greatly expanded since then. Today it is known as the International Terminal, located in the airport's northwestern sector. It has 25 gates (thirteen in concourse B numbered 8–37, and twelve in concourse C numbered 50–63) served by aerobridges. Pier B is used by Qantas, all Oneworld members, and all Skyteam members (except Delta Air Lines). Pier C is used by Virgin Australia and its partners (including Delta) as well as all Star Alliance members. There are also a number of remote bays which are heavily utilised during peak periods and for parking idle aircraft during the day.

The terminal building is split into three levels, one each for arrivals, departures, and airline offices. The departure level has 20 rows of check-in desks each with 10 single desks making a total of 200 check-in desks. The terminal hosts eight airline lounges: two for Qantas, and one each for The House, Air New Zealand, Singapore Airlines, Emirates, American Express, and SkyTeam. Further renovations began in 2015 with a reconfiguration and decluttering of outbound and inbound duty-free areas, an extension of the airside dining areas, and the installation of Australian Border Force outbound immigration SmartGates. These works were completed in 2016.

Terminal 2

Terminal 2, located in the airport's northeastern section, is a domestic terminal and the former home of Ansett Australia's domestic operations. It features 20 parking bays served by aerobridges and several remote bays for regional aircraft. It serves FlyPelican, Jetstar, Rex Airlines, and Virgin Australia. There are lounges for Rex Airlines and Virgin Australia.

Terminal 3
Terminal 3 is a domestic terminal, serving Qantas with QantasLink flights having moved their operations from Terminal 2 to Terminal 3 on 16 August 2013. Originally, it was home to Trans Australia Airlines (later named Australian Airlines). It is located in the northeastern section adjacent to Terminal 2, with which it shares an underground train station.

The current terminal building is largely the result of extensions designed by Hassell that were completed in 1999. This included the construction of a 60-metre roof span above a new column-free check-in hall and resulted in extending the terminal footprint to 80,000 square metres. There are 14 parking bays served by aerobridges, including two served by dual aerobridges. Terminal 3 features a large Qantas Club lounge, along with a dedicated Business Class and Chairman's lounge. Terminal 3 also has a 'Heritage Collection' located adjacent to gate 13, dedicated to Qantas and including many collections from the airline's 90-plus years of service. It also has a view of the airport's apron and is used commonly by plane-spotters.

In 2015, Qantas sold its lease of Terminal 3, which was due to continue until 2019, back to Sydney Airport for $535 million. This means Sydney Airport resumes operational responsibility of the terminal, including the lucrative retail areas.

Other terminals
Sydney Airport previously had a fourth passenger terminal, east of Terminal 2. This was formerly known as Domestic Express and was used by Rex Airlines, and low-cost carriers Virgin Blue (now known as Virgin Australia) and the now-defunct Impulse Airlines, during the time Terminal 2 was closed following the collapse of Ansett Australia. It is now used as an office building.

Freight terminals
The airport is a major hub for freight transport to and from Australia handling approximately 45 percent of the national cargo traffic. Therefore, it is equipped with extensive freight facilities including seven dedicated cargo terminals operated by several handlers.

Airlines and destinations

Passenger

Cargo

Second Sydney airport

The local, state and federal governments have investigated the viability of building a second major airport in Sydney since the 1940s. Significant passenger growth at Sydney Airport indicates the potential need for a second airport – for example, total passenger numbers increased from less than 10 million in 1985–86 to over 25 million in 2000–01 and over 40 million in 2015–16. This growth is expected to continue, with Sydney region passenger demand forecast to reach 87 million passengers by 2035.

On 15 April 2014, the Federal Government announced that Badgerys Creek would be Sydney's second international airport, to be known as Western Sydney Airport. Press releases suggest that the airport will not be subject to curfews and will open in phases, initially with a single airport runway and terminal. It would be linked to Sydney Airport by local roads and motorways, and by extensions to the existing suburban rail network. In May 2017 the Federal Government announced it would build (pay for) the second Sydney Airport after the Sydney Airport Group declined the Government's offer to build the second airport.

The new airport will be completed in 2026.

Traffic statistics

Total

Domestic
Sydney Airport handled over 27.5 million domestic passengers in the year ending 30 June 2019.

International
Sydney Airport handled 3.06 million international passengers in the year ending 30 June 2022.

Notes
Tokyo includes services to both Haneda and Narita airports.

Freight 
In 2019 Sydney Airport handled 521,014 tonnes of international air freight and 23,260 tonnes of international air mail.

Access

Public transport

The airport is accessible via Sydney Trains T8 Airport & South Line, providing regular service to the Sydney CBD and the southwestern suburbs, using the Airport Link underground rail line. The International Airport station is located below the International terminal, while the Domestic Airport station is located under the car park between the domestic terminals (Terminal 2 and Terminal 3). While the stations are part of the Sydney Trains suburban network, they are privately owned and operated by the Airport Link Company and their use is subject to a surcharge. The trains that service the airport are regular suburban trains. Unlike airport trains at some other airports, these do not have special provisions for customers with luggage, do not operate express to the airport, and may have all seats occupied by commuters before the trains arrive at the airport.

Transdev John Holland operates route 350 from the domestic terminal to Bondi Junction railway station while Transit Systems operates route 420 from Mascot railway station to Westfield Burwood via both International and Domestic terminals, as well as Banksia and Rockdale railway stations.

The airport station surcharge may be avoided by passengers alighting at nearby stations and walking to either the International Terminal (from Wolli Creek station, about 1.6 km)  or the Domestic Terminal (from Mascot station, about 1.8 km).

Road access

Sydney Airport has road connections in all directions. Southern Cross Drive (M1), a motorway, is the fastest link to the city centre. The M5 South Western Motorway (including the M5 East Freeway) links the airport with the south-western suburbs of Sydney. A ring road runs around the airport consisting of Airport Drive, Qantas Drive, General Holmes Drive, M5 East Freeway and Marsh Street. General Holmes Drive features a tunnel under the main north–south runway and three taxiways as well as providing access to an aircraft viewing area. Inside the airport a part-ring road – Ross Smith Avenue (named after Ross MacPherson Smith) – connects the Domestic Terminal with the control tower, the general aviation area, car-rental company storage yards, long-term car park, heliport, various retail operations and a hotel. A perimeter road runs inside the secured area for authorised vehicles only.

The New South Wales Government plans to build the Sydney Gateway, a major road interchange between the WestConnex motorway and Sydney Airport's terminals. The project will provide a motorway-grade road directly to the terminals. Construction is expected to begin in early 2021 and be open in 2024.

The Airport runs several official car parks—Domestic Short Term, Domestic Remote Long Term, and International Short/Long Term.

The International Terminal is located beside a wide pedestrian and bicycle path. It links Mascot and Sydney City in the north-east with Tempe (via a foot bridge over Alexandra Canal) and Botany Bay to the south-west. All terminals offer bicycle racks and are also easily accessible by foot from nearby areas.

Accidents and incidents
 On 10 September 1920, Arthur Herbert Tattle of Wellington, New Zealand, was killed on the runway at Mascot when he was struck on the crown of his head by a plane taking off. He had come to see two friends take off on the plane and was standing on the runway in the flight path with a camera looking down at the viewfinder when he failed to notice the speed of the fast approaching plane, its height or the shouted warning from the pilot. He was driven to South Sydney Hospital where he died soon after from "a concussion of the brain". An inquiry into the incident returned a finding of "accidental death" and was reported to be the first inquest in New South Wales resulting from an aeroplane accident.
 On 19 July 1945 a Consolidated C-87 Liberator Express operated by the Royal Air Force (RAF) bound for Manus Island failed to gain altitude after taking off from Sydney's now non-existent runway 22, struck trees and crashed into Muddy Creek, north of Brighton-Le-Sands. The aircraft exploded on impact, killing all 12 passengers and crew on board.  All the victims were service personnel, five from the RAF, one from the Royal New Zealand Air Force and six from the Royal Navy.
 On 18 June 1950 a Douglas DC-3 of Ansett Airways taxiing for take-off from runway 22 for a night-time passenger flight to Brisbane, hit and partially derailed a coal train travelling on the railway line that crossed the runway. Only the co-pilot was injured.
 On 30 November 1961, Ansett-ANA Flight 325, a Vickers Viscount, crashed into Botany Bay shortly after take-off. The starboard (right) wing failed after the aircraft flew into a thunderstorm. All 15 people on board were killed.
 On 1 December 1969, a Boeing 707-320B of Pan Am registered N892PA and operating as Flight 812 overran the runway during take-off due to bird strikes. The accident investigation established that the aircraft struck a flock of seagulls, with a minimum of 11 individual bird strikes to the leading edges of the wings and engines 1, 2, and 3 (the two engines on the left wing and the inboard engine on the right wing). In particular, blade 14 of number 2 engine (the inboard engine on the left wing) was damaged by a single bird carcass and lost power before the decision to abandon the take-off (which occurred at or near V1 or takeoff decision speed). The aircraft came to rest  beyond the end of runway 16 (now runway 16R). During the crash, number 2 engine hit the ground and was damaged. The nose and left main landing gears failed and the aircraft came to rest supported by engines 1 and 2, the nose, and the remainder of the main landing gear. There were no injuries or fatalities amongst the 125 passengers and 11 crew. The accident investigation concluded that the overrun was not inevitable.
 In 1970, a teenage boy from Randwick, climbed into the wheel well of a Tokyo bound Japan Air flight. As the plane was taking off he fell to his death. A photographer accidentally captured the accident.
 In 29 January 1971, a Boeing 727 of Trans Australia Airlines (registered VH-TJA) and taking off as Flight 592, struck the tail of a taxiing Douglas DC-8 of Canadian Pacific Air Lines (registered CF-CPQ) that had just landed as Flight 301. The DC-8 crew misinterpreted instructions on which exit to use after landing and backtracked along the runway instead of turning off it onto a taxiway; and the tower controller cleared the 727 for take-off in the mistaken belief that the runway was clear. The 727 crew saw the DC-8 during the take-off roll then proceeded with the take-off rather than take evasive measures. The 727 was damaged in the inboard right wing and the fuselage and lost pressure in one of its hydraulic systems but managed to return and land safely; a building on the ground was struck by parts of the 727's starboard landing gear doors that fell off as it approached to land. The upper eight-and-a-half feet (about 2.6m) of the DC-8's tail fin and a corresponding proportion of the rudder were torn off.
 In 1971, a terrorist tried to hijack a Pan Am Boeing 747 parked at the airport. He managed to get past the immigration and security screening. He then grabbed a female hostage and made some demands. Police were able to shoot and kill him.
 On 21 February 1980, a Beechcraft Super King Air registered VH-AAV and operating Advance Airlines Flight 4210 took off from Sydney Airport and suffered an engine failure. The pilot flew the aircraft back to the airport and attempted to land but crashed into the sea wall surrounding runway 16/34 (now 16R/34L). All 13 people on board died in the accident.
 On 24 April 1994, a Douglas DC-3 registered VH-EDC of South Pacific Airmotive had an engine malfunction shortly after take-off on a charter flight to Norfolk Island. The engine was feathered but airspeed decayed and it was found to be impossible to maintain height. A successful ditching was carried out into Botany Bay. All four crew and 21 passengers - pupils and teachers of Scots College and journalists, travelling to participate in Anzac Day commemorations on Norfolk Island - safely evacuated the aircraft. The investigation revealed that the aircraft was overloaded and the propeller was not fully feathered.
 On 19 October 1994, Ansett Australia Flight 881, a Boeing 747-300 registered VH-INH operating from Sydney to Osaka, returned and landed at Sydney without the nose wheel extended. Approximately one hour after departure the crew shut down the number one engine because of an oil leak. They returned the aircraft to Sydney where the approach proceeded normally until the landing gear was extended. The landing gear warning horn began to sound because the nose landing gear had not extended. The flight crew unsuccessfully attempted to establish the reason for the warning. Believing the gear to be down, the crew elected to complete the landing, with the result that the aircraft was landed with the nose gear retracted. There was no fire and the pilot in command decided not to initiate an emergency evacuation. All passengers and crew were evacuated safely.

See also
 List of airports in Greater Sydney
 List of airports in New South Wales
 RAAF Station Mascot
 Transport in Australia
 United States Army Air Forces in Australia (World War II)

Notes

References

External links

 Official website
 Sydney Tower
 Sydney Airport Frequency and Airway Data

 
Airports in New South Wales
Airports in Greater Sydney
1920 establishments in Australia
Airports established in 1920
Airfields of the United States Army Air Forces in Australia
Mascot, New South Wales
Botany Bay
Transport in Sydney
International airports in Australia